Bjørn Jacobsen (born 11 June 1960 in Sandnessjøen, Helgeland) is a Norwegian politician for the Socialist Left Party (SV). He was elected to the Norwegian Parliament from Møre og Romsdal in 2001.

He was a member of the Harstad municipality council from 1983 to 1985, and a deputy member in Molde from 1995 to 1999.

Parliamentary Committee duties 
2005 - 2009 member of the Enlarged Foreign Affairs Committee.
2005 - 2009 member of the Standing Committee on Defence.
2005 - 2009 deputy member of the Electoral Committee.
2001 - 2005 member of the Enlarged Foreign Affairs Committee.
2001 - 2005 member of the Standing Committee on Foreign Affairs.
2001 - 2005 deputy member of the Electoral Committee.

External links

1960 births
Living people
People from Alstahaug
Socialist Left Party (Norway) politicians
Members of the Storting
21st-century Norwegian politicians